Satyajit Sharma (born 31 July 1969) is an Indian film and television actor. Sharma is known for his portrayal of the character Basant in the television soap opera Balika Vadhu.

Filmography
• Nai Subah telefilm
Yeh Faasley
Paa as Jaikirt
Don as Mystery man
Inteqam: The Perfect Game
Chameli as Police inspector
Hazaaron Khwaishein Aisi as Maharaja's elder son
Bas Yaari Rakho as Brother Lobo
My Little Devil
Chal Challa Chal as Labour Officer
Uri: The Surgical Strike as Lt. General Ajay Garewal
Kaminey as Francis
Hum as Vikram Bedi

Television

References

External links
 
 

1969 births
Living people
People from Mahendragarh
Male actors from New Delhi
Indian male television actors
Male actors in Hindi television
Male actors in Hindi cinema